Hellinsia kuwayamai is a moth of the family Pterophoridae. It is known from Japan (Hokkaido, Honshu, Kyushu), Korea and China.

The wingspan is about 16 mm and the length of the forewings is 8–9 mm.

The larvae feed on Aster ageratoides and Aster yomena.

References

External links
Taxonomic And Biological Studies Of Pterophoridae Of Japan (Lepidoptera)
Japanese Moths

kuwayamai
Moths of Korea
Moths of Asia
Moths of Japan
Moths described in 1931
Taxa named by Shōnen Matsumura